The Ambassador of Australia to Germany is an officer of the Australian Department of Foreign Affairs and Trade and the head of the Embassy of the Commonwealth of Australia to the Federal Republic of Germany. The position has the rank and status of an Ambassador Extraordinary and Plenipotentiary and formerly held non-resident accreditation for Switzerland (1993–2022) and Liechtenstein (1999–2022), until the establishment of a resident Australian Embassy in Berne on 22 November 2022. Since 1986 there has also been a Consulate-General in Frankfurt am Main, the German financial capital, which is managed by Austrade. The current ambassador since October 2020 is Philip Green.

Posting history

Early representation and the Military Mission in Berlin
Immediately prior to the end of the war in Europe on 8 May 1945, on 15 March 1945 the Australian Cabinet recommended the appointment of an Australian Military Mission to the Allied Control Council for Germany and Austria, to consist of one representative from each of the armed services and a political adviser. On 3 October 1945, Brigadier Tom Warren White was appointed Head of the Australian Military Mission in Berlin, and career diplomat with the Department of External Affairs, J. D. L. Hood, was appointed political advisor, taking up office on 15 December 1945. On 1 January 1948, the Department of External Affairs took over responsibility for the mission in Berlin from the Department of Defence, and Brigadier White was succeeded by Brigadier Frederick Galleghan on 23 January 1948. On 17 November 1949, a career diplomat, Noël Deschamps, was appointed as the acting head of the military mission, and in May 1950 a new office of the Australian Mission was established in the city of Bonn, the provisional capital of the federal republic, with accreditation to the Allied High Commission for occupied Germany.

Deschamps continued to serve as acting head of the Bonn Mission, and then as Chargé d'Affaires from 28 January 1952, when the Bonn mission was upgraded to the status of embassy. With the appointment of J. D. L. Hood as Australia's first Ambassador to the Federal Republic of Germany in April 1952, Hood would also hold office as the Head of the Australian Military Mission in Berlin, with a Deputy Head of Mission being resident in Berlin from 1955. This situation continued, including also holding office as Consul-General in the city from 16 January 1972, until the post was scaled down on 15 September 1976 and the Berlin mission was closed on 30 April 1987.

Embassy in Bonn, 1952–1999
On 28 January 1952, the Minister for External Affairs, Richard Casey, announced that the Australian Mission in Bonn would be upgraded to the status of embassy and that formal diplomatic relations would be established with the Federal Republic of Germany (West Germany), noting that this action "reflected the extent to which Western Germany, in close association with the United Kingdom, the United States and other free nations on the Continent, is co-operating in maintaining stability in Europe. Future developments in Germany would have a significant influence on world peace, and it was desirable that Australia should be adequately represented there." On 8 April 1952, the appointment of J. D. L. Hood as Australia's first Ambassador to the Federal Republic of Germany was announced. 

In 1964, an office of the Australian Trade Commission and Consulate was opened in the city of Hamburg, with the first Trade Commissioner and Consul, Terence Cronin, having responsibility for "trade inquiries for Australian foodstuffs and manufactures, ... to assist in the preparation of commodity surveys, organise trade fairs as allocated by [the embassy in] Bonn, and report directly to Canberra on shipping and warehousing that might affect Australian trading interests", as well as being appointed as consul in the city to assist the embassy. Upgraded to a consulate-general in 1968, the Hamburg post was closed in 1979. In 1986 the Trade Commission moved its operations from the embassy in Bonn to a new office and consulate-general in the city of Frankfurt am Main, the German financial capital.

From 1974 to 1993 there was an embassy in Berne, Switzerland. In January 1993 the Berne embassy was closed and non-resident accreditation was transferred to the Australian Embassy in Bonn.

Embassy to the German Democratic Republic, 1973–1990
On 22 December 1972, Australia and the German Democratic Republic (East Germany) formally established diplomatic relations, coming at a time of a more pragmatic Australian foreign policy under the direction of Prime Minister Gough Whitlam and Foreign Minister Don Willesee, with Whitlam noting: "Apart from facilitating trade in both directions, Australian recognition of East Germany would, when agreement is reached, make people in Europe more aware that there is a new government in Australia which is not concentrating on South-East Asia and the Pacific to the exclusion of our highly important relations with Europe." On 15 June 1973, it was announced that the incoming resident ambassador to Poland, Francis Hamilton Stuart, would receive non-resident accreditation as the first Australian ambassador to East Germany. In September 1974, however, it was announced by foreign minister Willesee that an Australian Embassy would be established in East Germany, which was achieved in March 1975, with the first resident ambassador, Malcolm Morris, presenting his credentials on 10 December 1975.

Budget cuts to the Department of Foreign Affairs by the government of Bob Hawke prompted the closure of the GDR Embassy on 19 December 1986, with non-resident accreditation returning to the Ambassador resident in Warsaw until the reunification of Germany on 3 October 1990, when a Consulate-General was opened in the unified city of Berlin.

Embassy in Berlin, since 1999
With the unification of Germany in 1990, a new Consulate-General with resident representation was established in Berlin on 11 October 1990, with David Charles appointed as consul-general. Charles was succeeded in October 1993 by Margaret Adamson, who served until 1996. In order to facilitate the move to the new capital of Berlin, in 1995 the Australian Government purchased two historic buildings for the new embassy chancery, on Wallstraße and Markisches Ufer in Mitte, Berlin, which was opened on 17 August 1999. A newly-built ambassador's residence, in Grunewald, Charlottenburg-Wilmersdorf, was designed by Daryl Jackson Pty Ltd and completed in 1998.

In 2012 Australia and Germany celebrated 60 years of diplomatic relations. In November 2022, a resident embassy in Berne, Switzerland, was reopened and accreditation for Switzerland and Liechtenstein were transferred there.

Heads of mission

Ambassadors to the Federal Republic of Germany

Notes 
 Also Head of the Australian Military Mission in Berlin, 1949–1987.
 Also non-resident Ambassador to the Swiss Confederation, 1993–2022.
 Also non-resident Ambassador to the Principality of Liechtenstein, 1999–2022.

Resident Heads of the Australian Military Mission, Berlin, 1945–1987

Ambassadors to the German Democratic Republic, 1973–1990

See also
Australia–Germany relations
Australia–Switzerland relations
List of German Ambassadors to Australia
List of ambassadors of Australia to Switzerland
Foreign relations of Australia

References

External links

Australian Embassy, Germany
Austrade offices – Australian Consulate-General Frankfurt

 
 
 
 
 
Germany
Australia